Terence O'Brien or Terrence O'Brien may refer to:

Terence O'Brien (actor) (1887–1970), Irish-born British actor
Terence O'Brien (British diplomat) (1921–2006), British Ambassador to Nepal, 1970–1974, Burma, 1974–1978, and Indonesia, 1978–1981
Sir Terence O'Brien (colonial governor) (1830–1904), British Governor of Newfoundland, 1889–1895
Terence O'Brien (New Zealand diplomat) (1936–2022), New Zealand Ambassador to the United Nations, 1980–1983, 1990–1993, and the European Community, 1983–1986
Terence O'Brien (rower) (1906–1982), English Olympic rower
Terence O'Brien (bishop) (1600–1651), Irish Roman Catholic bishop of Emly
Terrence O'Brien (director), American founder and director of the Hudson Valley Shakespeare Festival
Terrence L. O'Brien (born 1943), United States federal judge